The Dallair Aeronautica FR-100 Snap! is a homebuilt aerobatic aircraft that can be certified in multiple categories.

Design and development
The Snap! is imported to the United States and may be certified as an Experimental-Exhibition model, S-LSA, or Experimental LSA.

The Snap! is a single-seat low-wing taildragger. It is rated for 6gs positive and 3 gs negative g-force. The fuselage is constructed of welded steel tubing with a carbon fiber covering. The wings are all-aluminum. The aircraft has inverted fuel and oil systems.

Dallair production ended in 2013 and production was assumed by Tecnam as the Tecnam Snap.

Variants
FR-01
Version for the European market. 
FR-100 Snap!
Version for the US market.

Specifications (FR100 Snap!)

References

External links
FR-01 official website
FR-100 official website

Homebuilt aircraft